Erwin Matelski (born 3 February 1936) is a Polish sports shooter. He competed in the mixed 50 metre free pistol event at the 1980 Summer Olympics.

References

External links
 

1936 births
Living people
Polish male sport shooters
Olympic shooters of Poland
Shooters at the 1980 Summer Olympics
Sportspeople from Łódź